is the 14th single by Japanese idol girl group Nogizaka46. It was released on March 23, 2016. It was number-one on the weekly Oricon Singles Chart, with 749,706 copies sold. It was also number-one on the Billboard Japan Hot 100.

Release 
This single was released in 5 versions. Type-A, Type-B, Type-C, Type-D and a regular edition. The center position in the choreography for the title song is held by Mai Fukagawa. This is her first time as a center performer, and it is also her final single with Nogizaka46.

Track listing
All lyrics written by Yasushi Akimoto.

Regular Edition

Type-A

Type-B

Type-C

Type-D

Chart and certifications

Weekly charts

Year-end charts

Certifications

References

Further reading

External links
 Discography  on Nogizaka46 Official Website
 
 Nogizaka46 Movie Digest on YouTube

2016 singles
2016 songs
Japanese-language songs
Nogizaka46 songs
Oricon Weekly number-one singles
Billboard Japan Hot 100 number-one singles
Song articles with missing songwriters
Songs with lyrics by Yasushi Akimoto